The 2022 Triple J Hottest 100 was announced on 28 January 2023. It was the 30th annual countdown of the most popular songs of the year, as voted for by listeners of Australian radio station Triple J. The day before, the Hottest 200 played, counting down songs 200–101. Merchandise sales from the event supported the Australian Conservation Foundation.

Australian musician Flume's song "Say Nothing" featuring May-a was voted into first place. Australian band Spacey Jane had the most entries, with six, including three in the top 10. Over 2.4 million votes were submitted, and 57 entries in the countdown originated from Australian artists.

Background 
Any song initially released between 1 December 2021 and 30 November 2022 is eligible for the Triple J Hottest 100 of 2022. The Triple J Hottest 100 allows members of the public to vote online for their top ten songs of the year, which are then used to calculate the year's 100 most popular songs. Voting opened on 13 December 2022, and closed on 23 January 2023.

The 2021 Triple J Hottest 100 culminated with the Wiggles' Like a Version cover of Tame Impala's "Elephant" reaching number one. Over $1.2 million was raised for crisis support organisation Lifeline, the countdown's partner.

Projections 
On 10 January 2023, Triple J announced there were fewer than 125 votes separating the top two songs. Online database 100 Warm Tunas, "the internet's most accurate prediction" of Hottest 100 results, was favouring "In the Wake of Your Leave" by Australian alternative rock band Gang of Youths to take the top spot, followed by "Hardlight" by Fremantle-based rock band Spacey Jane and "Stars in My Eyes" by Brisbane-based pop rock band Ball Park Music. The former two bands also had major wins in the Triple J Album Poll and the 2022 J Awards respectively. On the day of the countdown, Sportsbet had English DJs Eliza Rose and Interplanetary Criminal's "B.O.T.A. (Baddest of Them All)" and Australian producer Flume's "Say Nothing" as the most likely to win outright.

Full list

Countries represented 
 Australia – 57
 United States – 28
 United Kingdom – 25
 Canada – 3
 Ghana – 2
 Netherlands – 2
 Japan – 1
 Sweden – 1
 New Zealand – 1
 Germany – 1
 Italy – 1

Artists with multiple entries

Six entries 
 Spacey Jane (3, 5, 6, 25, 40, 75)

Four entries 
 Flume – three as primary artist and once as a featured artist (1, 30, 46, 50)
 Fred Again (14, 18, 26, 100)
 Lime Cordiale (15, 34, 60, 93)
 King Stingray (27, 35, 43, 94)

Three entries 
 Ocean Alley (56, 59, 62)

Two entries 
 Steve Lacy (4, 72)
 Lizzo (7, 36)
 G Flip (11, 96)
 Tame Impala – once solo and once as a featured artist (13, 73)
 Peach PRC (16, 65)
 Genesis Owusu (17, 87)
 Thelma Plum (21, 66)
 Doja Cat – once solo and once as a featured artist (22, 51)
 Beyoncé (24, 42)
 Billie Eilish (32, 84)
 Bring Me the Horizon – once solo and once as a featured artist (38, 69)
 Drake (44, 76)
 21 Savage – once as a co-lead artist and once as a featured artist (44, 76)
 Fisher (48, 68)
 Hilltop Hoods (54, 71)
 The 1975 (58, 88)
 Arctic Monkeys (77, 79)

Notes 
 With Hilltop Hoods being voted into the countdown twice, this marks their 22nd and 23rd appearances in a Hottest 100, overtaking Powderfinger and Foo Fighters' 22 appearances each to become the most featured artist in Hottest 100 history.
 With Spacey Jane having six tracks voted into the countdown, they match an annual record set by Wolfmother in the 2005 poll. With three songs in the top 10 – a feat only achieved three other times (most recently, Gang of Youths in 2017) – the band also became the eighth artist in the countdown's history to have two songs poll in the top 5.

Top 10 albums of 2022 
The Triple J Album Poll was held across November and December and was announced on 11 December 2022. Indie rock band Spacey Jane topped the poll for the second time, following their win with debut album Sunlight in 2020. Weirder & Weirder at second place and The Car at ninth mark both Ball Park Music's and Arctic Monkeys' seventh appearances each in the annual poll, with every prior studio album from both bands making an appearance in past polls.

References 

2022
Triple J
Top lists